The Young Ladies Radio League (YLRL) is an international non-profit organization of women amateur radio enthusiasts.  It was founded in 1939 and is affiliated with the American Radio Relay League.  The term "Young Lady" derives from a Morse code abbreviation, YL, that is used to refer to female amateur radio operators, regardless of age. (As male operators of any age are addressed as OM or "old man", the non-licensed spouse of an OM is often called an XYL.) 

The Young Ladies' Radio League welcomes all licensed amateur radio women as members.  The YLRL is organized into 10 districts in the United States (that correspond to the 10 amateur radio call sign districts), a district for Canada, and a "DX" district that covers the rest of the world.  The YLRL holds a tri-annual convention at various locations.

Services 
The YLRL provides many services for its members including publishing a bimonthly newsletter, YL Harmonics. It also provides an audio tape version of YL Harmonics for sight-impaired members. There are also two scholarships granted to worthy YLs to continue their higher education with priority given for students whose majors are in communications and electronics or related arts and sciences.

Contests 
The YLRL sponsors several amateur radio contests throughout the year. Among these are the YL-OM in February and the DX-NA-YL Contest in October.

References

External links 
 YLRL official web site
 

Amateur radio organizations
Organizations established in 1939
1939 establishments in the United States